Bulldog Courage is a 1922 American silent Western film directed by Edward A. Kull, and starring George Larkin and Bessie Love. It was written by Larkin and his wife Ollie Kirkby, with a screenplay by Jeanne Poe. It was produced by Russell Productions and distributed by State Rights.

The film is preserved in the collection of the British Film Institute.

Plot 
College athlete Jimmy Brent (Larkin) is sent to Wyoming to beat up Big Bob Phillips, his uncle's rival for the hand of Mary Allen. When Jimmy arrives in Wyoming, he falls in love with Gloria Phillips (Love), and decides not to beat up Phillips. When Phillips mistakenly thinks that Jimmy is the cause of cattle rustling, Jimmy fights Phillips, catches the actual cattle rustlers, and gets the girl.

Cast 
 George Larkin as Jimmy Brent
 Bessie Love as Gloria Phillips
 Albert MacQuarrie as John Morton
 Karl Silvera as Smokey Evans
 Frank Whitman as Big Bob Phillips
 Bill Patton as Sheriff Webber
 Barbara Tennant as Mary Allen

Production 
Filming took place in Oregon.

Reception 
Although few contemporaneous reviews of the film exist today, Bessie Love considered this film as one of the first indicators of decline in her silent film career.

References

External links 

 
 
 

1922 Western (genre) films
1922 films
American black-and-white films
Films directed by Edward A. Kull
Films set in Wyoming
Films shot in Oregon
Surviving American silent films
Silent American Western (genre) films
1920s American films
1920s English-language films